Vanderpoorten is a surname. Notable people with the surname include:

Arthur Vanderpoorten (1884–1945), Belgian politician
Herman Vanderpoorten (1922–1984), Belgian politician
Marleen Vanderpoorten (born 1954), Belgian politician
Vivimarie Vanderpoorten, Sri Lankan writer and poet